Daniel Didech is a Democratic member of the Illinois House of Representatives for the 59th district. The district, located in the Chicago metropolitan area, includes all or part of Vernon Hills, Prairie View, Buffalo Grove, Indian Creek, Lincolnshire, Mundelein, Riverwoods, and Wheeling.

Didech won election as the Vernon Township Supervisor in 2017. The following year, he was elected to the Illinois House to succeed retiring Democratic Representative Carol Sente, defeating Republican opponent Karen Feldman.

As of July 3, 2022, Representative Didech is a member of the following Illinois House Committees:

 (Chairman of) Clean Energy Subcommittee (HENG-CLEA)
 Commercial & Property Subcommittee (HJUA-COMM)
 Counties & Townships Committee (HCOT)
 Energy & Environment Committee (HENG)
 Ethics & Elections Committee (SHEE)
 Housing Committee (SHOU)
 Judiciary - Civil Committee (HJUA)

Electoral history

References

External links
 Daniel Didech Legislative website
 Campaign website

Year of birth missing (living people)
21st-century American politicians
Democratic Party members of the Illinois House of Representatives
People from Buffalo Grove, Illinois
Roosevelt University alumni
Valparaiso University School of Law alumni
Living people